Archie Gips is an American filmmaker and producer raised in New Rochelle, New York, who resides in Los Angeles. He is a cofounder and partner/president of Unrealistic Ideas, a production company that specializes in nonscripted formats. His partners are Mark Wahlberg and Stephen Levinson.

Early life

Gips studied broadcast journalism at Syracuse University before moving to Chicago,
where he was trained at The Second City and wrote several plays and sketch
shows, including the comedy revue Saturday Morning Live. He received his masters in film from New York University's Tisch School of the Arts, where he won the top Graduate Screenwriting Student Award and New York Picture Company Award for Best Comedic Screenplay.

In an online interview, Gips says he was heavily influenced by his father, Philip Gips a graphic designer who created iconic film posters for such films as Rosemary's Baby, and his mother, Barbara Gips a copywriter who penned the classic Alien tagline, "In space no one can hear you scream."

Career

His first feature-length film, Loveless in Los Angeles, is a romantic comedy that takes place behind the scenes of a reality dating show. The plot and characters were informed by his work as a writer/producer for Blind Date, EX-treme Dating and The Fifth Wheel.

Gips wrote the animated feature, The Golden Blaze, featuring the voices of Blair Underwood and Neil Patrick Harris. The film took top honors
at the 2005 Giffoni International Film Festival.

He co-directed and produced the documentary feature The Ambassadors of Hollywood, which examines the lives of the costumed characters who work on Hollywood Boulevard, and then wrote and directed Chloe and Keith's Wedding, the first independent feature ever marketed solely as a viral video. A clip from the film, which depicts a bride and a priest being knocked into a pool during a wedding ring exchange by the best man, has been viewed by more than 100 million people online. Titled Worst Best Man Ever, Clumsy Best Man Ruins Wedding, or Wedding Ring Exchange Fail, the movie clip became a viral sensation, making several top ten best lists including #80 on Time.com's best 99 viral videos of all time and featured on Yahoo's and AOL's home pages. The clip was also aired on hundreds of television talk shows and news
broadcasts, most notably The Today Show, The Ellen DeGeneres Show, Good Morning America, and Inside Edition and has been used in TV commercials throughout the world. In all, the film clip has been seen by more than 100 million people worldwide online and on TV.  Chloe and Keith's Wedding had a limited theatrical release in fall 2012.

Gips also helped produce two features for Paramount Pictures. The Jon Chu feature film, Justin Bieber: Never Say Never and Katy Perry: Part of Me.

In television, he serves as executive producer & showrunner for A&E's Wahlburgers. In 2015, Gips was nominated for an Emmy Award for Outstanding Unstructured Reality Program. He also executive produced TLC's Welcome to Myrtle Manor, Style Network's XOX Betsey Johnson and WE tv's Braxton Family Values. The first season of BFV was the #1 rated reality show on WE tv and the network ordered a 13-episode second season of the show after the third episode. Gips has directed, produced and written for ABC's Academy Awards Red Carpet show and was a consulting producer for the A&E hit show, Duck Dynasty.

Gips formed Unrealistic Ideas, a non-scripted production company with partners Mark Wahlberg and Stephen Levinson. Gips serves as president and has executive produced several projects through Unrealistic Ideas including the hit HBO true crime limited documentary series, McMIllions, Roku’s Run This City, HBO’s The Murders at Starved Rock, and HBO Max’s Wahl Street in which he also appears on camera.  Gips was nominated for an Emmy Award for Outstanding Documentary Or Nonfiction Series for McMillions, a Critic’s Choice Real TV Award for Best Business Show for Wahl Street, an IDA Documentary Award for Best Short Form Series for Run This City and a News and Documentary Emmy Award for Outstanding Crime and Justice Documentary for Murders at Starved Rock.

Filmography

Director
Chloe & Keith's Wedding  
The Ambassadors of Hollywood
83rd & 84th Annual Academy Awards Red Carpet Show (segments)
Loveless in Los Angeles

Writer
Chloe & Keith's Wedding  
Loveless in Los Angeles  
The Golden Blaze 
The Fifth Wheel
Blind Date

Producer
Katy Perry: Part of Me.
Justin Bieber: Never Say Never  
Wahlburgers  
Welcome to Myrtle Manor  
Duck Dynasty  
XOX Betsey Johnson  
Tamar & Vince  
Braxton Family Values  
Top Chef  
Loveless in Los Angeles  
Last Comic Standing
McMillions
’’Wahl Street’’

References

External links

American film producers
American male screenwriters
Writers from New York City
Year of birth missing (living people)
Living people
Syracuse University alumni
Tisch School of the Arts alumni
Film directors from New York City
Screenwriters from New York (state)